Capriglia Irpina is a town and comune in the province of Avellino, Campania, Italy.

People 
 Gian Pietro Carafa, Pope Paul IV

References

Cities and towns in Campania